Sarada Charan Das (15 May 1906 – 6 September 1992) was an Indian Bengali polymath, scientist, confectioner, entrepreneur and businessman. He was the youngest son and successor of Krishna Chandra Das (K.C. Das) and the grandson of the legendary Bengali confectioner Nobin Chandra Das (the inventor of the Rossogolla and widely known as the Columbus of Rossogolla ). Born on 15 May 1906 (in Bagbazaar, Kolkata, India), he established the first confectionery company in India, named K.C. Das Private Limited, in 1946. Sarada Charan also created artwork and competed for India at the 1956 Summer Olympics in weightlifting. He is considered as the founding father of K.C. Das Private Limited and a major innovator and pioneer of the Bengali sweetmeat industry due to his contributions towards revamping, modernizing and scientifically standardizing the confectionery industry.

Birth and early life 

Sarada Charan was born on 15 May 1906 to the noted confectioner family of the Das'es of Bagbazar as the youngest son of Krishna Chandra Das (K.C. Das), in Kolkata, India.

Being of an intellectual bent of mind, in his early twenties, after completing a degree from Vidyasagar College, Sarada Charan initially pursued a career in scientific research under physicist and Nobel Laureate Sir C.V. Raman at the Rajabazar Science College, between 1926 and 1930. However, the expectations of his business family and the social customs of his times were not in favour of Sarada Charan's scientific ambitions. His father Krishna Chandra strongly opposed the idea of his son accepting any form of employment beyond the parameters of their prestigious family business. In order to engage and induct his youngest and apparently most talented son into the confectionery business, Krishna Chandra Das started a brand new venture at Jorasako in 1930 appointing Sarada Charan at the helm of affairs. This shop was christened after Krishna Chandra Das and later modified by Sarada Charan to its now universally recognised modern form "K.C. Das". This is where father and son amalgamated their ideas to come up with the canned form of their family's signature dish Rossogolla in 1930; which was also the first canned sweet manufactured in India.

Patronage of art and culture 

Jamini Roy's greatest gift of gratitude to his dear friend and benefactor Sarada Charan was his magnum opus – the Ramayana was made into seventeen parts on canvas. Jamini Roy's Ramayana is on display at the Das residence "Rossogolla Bhavan" in Kolkata. The Das residence today harbors the largest private collection of Jamini Roy paintings with 25 of the master's originals.

Establishment of K.C.Das Grandsons 

In 1955, Sarada Charan had a major disagreement with his second son Debendra Nath, leading to a permanent estrangement within the family. Debendra Nath left his ancestral home and family business and went on to establish an independent entity, K.C. Das Grandsons Private Limited, in 1956.

Expansion of K.C.Das to South India 

To combat acute scarcity of milk, the West Bengal government introduced a Milk Trade Control Order in 1965. This legislation severely curtailed the supply of milk to confectioners and resulted in a major negative impact on the business of Bengali confectioners. The K.C. Das company had to scale down operations drastically and barring the Esplanade establishment which sold savouries along with sweets, all the other K.C.Das shops were shut down, along with the historical Nobin Chandra Das establishment. West Bengal's growing energy crisis and resultant shortage of electricity added to the organization's problems.

Death and legacy

Sarada Charan died at the age of 86, on 6 September 1992. His legacy continues to influence not only his own company but also the Bengali confectionery industry at large. On the occasion of Sarada Charan's birth centenary in 2006 and the Platinum Jubilee of the "K.C. Das" confectionery, the company formally outlined its fourfold mission statement:

Children 

Sarada Charan and Annapurna Devi had seven children, Rabindra Nath Das (1927–2000), Debendra Nath Das (1930–2010), Narendra Nath Das (1932–1993), Dhirendra Nath Das (1934–2018), Birendranath Das (1935–present), Monika Das (1937–1940) and Manjulika Das (1939–2012).

See also 
Nobin Chandra Das
K.C. Das
K.C.Das Grandson

References

Businesspeople from Kolkata
Confectioners
1906 births
1992 deaths
Bengali culture
Indian confectionery
Bengali Hindus